Mordechai David Palzur (born 1929, Tarnów, Poland) was an Israeli military officer, diplomat and chairman of the WJC Institute.

Biography
Palzur immigrated to Palestine in 1943, going on to study law at the Tel-Aviv School of Law and Economics and later, law, international relations and political science at the Hebrew University of Jerusalem.

Military career
Palzur was injured while serving as an officer during the 1947–1949 Palestine war and was released from military service in 1949.  He returned to serve on the General Staff during the Six-Day War. He has been awarded Israeli military distinctions including the Order of the Haganah; Fighters of the State of Israel; Independence Star; and the Six-Day War ribbon.

Diplomatic career

He joined the Foreign Service in 1950 and served in Mexico as Consul (1961–64), in Pretoria as Counselor and Chargé d'Affairs (1969–71), Chargé d'Affairs to Cyprus (1971–74). Because of his efforts at rescuing Israeli journalists during the Turkish invasion of Cyprus in 1974, Palzur was cited for gallantry by the Israeli Foreign Minister, General Yigal Allon. From 1975–78 he served as Ambassador to Bolivia, 1982–86 Ambassador to the Dominican Republic, Antigua and Barbuda, St. Kitts and Nevis, Trinidad and Tobago and Barbados. When he was appointed to Warsaw in 1986, he was “the first Israeli diplomat to serve behind the Iron Curtain since the severance of diplomatic relations by Communist countries as a result of the Six-Day War” serving as Ambassador until 1990.

References

External links
German wiki article

Ambassadors of Israel to Antigua and Barbuda
Ambassadors of Israel to Cyprus
Ambassadors of Israel to South Africa
Israeli consuls
Ambassadors of Israel to Poland
Ambassadors of Israel to Barbados
Hebrew University of Jerusalem Faculty of Law alumni
People from Tarnów
Polish emigrants to Mandatory Palestine
Israeli people of the Six-Day War
Israeli officers
Israeli military casualties
Ambassadors of Israel to the Dominican Republic
Ambassadors of Israel to Trinidad and Tobago
1929 births
Living people
Ambassadors of Israel to Lesotho